Barbara Heinemann Landmann (January 11, 1795 – May 21, 1883) was a spiritual leader with the Community of True Inspiration, for which she served as Werkzeug, or Instrument, in both Europe and the United States. Her sermons and writings are still used during the Community's religious services.

Biography 
Landmann was born as Barbara Heinemann to a German family in the territory of Alsace, France in 1795. During her childhood she worked as a wool spinner and later in a restaurant. In 1817, at age 22, she experienced a religious vision and joined the Community of True Inspiration (Scheuner, 1873). She became a Werkzeug with the German congregation of the Community in 1818. Landmann was arrested in 1819 when the village of Bergzabern decided to persecute the Inspirationists. Later that year she was banished from the congregation due to a pregnancy out of wedlock, though she was able to retain many of her own followers. 

She married George Landmann in 1823, but the husband and wife were again banished from their congregation. They emigrated to the United States with several followers. After settling in the present-day West Seneca, New York, Landmann again became a Werkzeug with the Ebenezer Colonies in the area. Between ages 28 and 54 she retired from the role due to a loss of faith, but she returned to the role in 1849 after experiencing another religious vision. In that year she moved with some followers to Homestead, Iowa and started another congregation of Inspirationists known as the Amana Colonies. She served as Werkzeug for this congregation until her death at age 88 in 1883. 

Landmann's work with the Amana Colonies in Iowa was noted by author Charles Nordhoff in the book The Communistic Societies of the United States (1875). After her death, Landmann was buried in a modest grave at the Amana Colonies (Shambaugh, 1908).

References
Bach, M. (1971).  Heinemann, Barbara (Jan. 11, 1795 – May 21, 1883).  In E. T. James (Ed.), Notable American Women, 1607–1950.  Cambridge, MA: Belknap Press of Harvard University Press.  .
Bezeugungen des Geistes des Herrn.  Thousands of pages of manuscripts have been preserved by the Community.  Much of this material consists of  testimonies of the Werkzeuge.
Gruber, E. L. (1715).  Bericht von der Inspirations-Sache.
Gruber, E. L. (1720).  Kennzeichen der Göttlichkeit der Wahren Inspiration.
Jahrbuch (1880).
Mackinet, B. D. (1749).  Essay concerning the Godliness of True Inspiration.
Metz, C. (1822).  Historische Beschreibung der Wahren Inspirations-Gemeinschaft.
Metz, C. (1849).  Auszüge aus den Tagbüchern von Br. Christian Metz.
Noé, C. F. (1904).  Brief History of the Amana Society 1714-1900, Iowa Journal of History and Politics, April, 1904.  Iowa: State Historical Society.
Nordhoff, C. (1875).  The Communistic Societies of the United States.  1961 reprint.  New York: Hillary House Publishers, Ltd.
Perkins, W. R. and Wick, B.L. (1891).  History of the Amana Society or Community of True Inspiration. Iowa City: State University of Iowa.  .
Scheuner, G. (1873).  Short Narration of the Circumstances Concerning the Awakening and The Early Divine Guidance of Barbara Heinemann, (later Landmann) as she herself related them, in her 79th year.
Shambaugh, B. M. H. (1908).  Amana: the Community of True Inspiration.  1988, facsimile, Museum of Amana History and the State Historical Society of Iowa.  Iowa: Penfield Press.  
Zuber, J. W. (1981).  Barbara Heinemann Landmann Biography, E. L. Gruber's Teachings on Divine Inspiration and Other Essays.  Lake Mills, Iowa 50450: Graphic Publishing Company, Inc.

1795 births
1883 deaths
Amana Colonies
People from Bas-Rhin
French religious leaders
French emigrants to the United States
American religious leaders
19th-century American people